Newman's speckled skink (Oligosoma newmani) is a species of skink found in New Zealand.

References

Oligosoma
Reptiles described in 1985
Reptiles of New Zealand
Endemic fauna of New Zealand
Taxa named by Richard Walter Wells
Taxa named by Cliff Ross Wellington
Endemic reptiles of New Zealand